The Watzmann Glacier is one of the five recognised glaciers in Germany.

Geography 
Watzmann Glacier is located below the famous east face of the Watzmann in the Watzmann cirque and is surrounded by the Watzmanngrat arête, the Watzmannkindern and the Kleiner Watzmann.

Its classification as a glacier is not undisputed by scientists, however, due to its size and its low flow velocity.

Above and to the west of the icefield lie the remains of a Ju 52 transport aircraft which crashed in October 1940.

Amongst the other permanent snow and icefields nearby are the Eiskapelle ("Ice Chapel"), which is well-known due to its easy accessibility from St. Bartholomä and may be the lowest-lying, permanent snowfield in the Alps, and the Schöllhorneis on the east face itself.

References

External links 

 Archive of Bavarian Glaciers

Glaciers of Bavaria
Glaciers of the Alps
Berchtesgaden Alps